The Pioneer Athletic Conference is a high school athletic conference with twelve members properly abbreviated as the PAC. The Pioneer Athletic Conference is affiliated with the Pennsylvania Interscholastic Athletic Association (PIAA) and all participating school districts are located within the southeastern quadrant of Pennsylvania. The Pioneer Athletic Conference was founded in 1985 and was then known as the "PAC-8" due to then-current membership total.

Current Membership

Past Membership Moves

1985 - Founding Members
The Pioneer Athletic Conference, then known as the PAC-8, was composed of the following charter members:

1988 - Great Valley & Owen J. Roberts Join
Great Valley and Owen J. Roberts join the Pioneer Athletic Conference and bring the total membership to ten.

2002 - Great Valley replaced by Boyertown
Great Valley left the PAC-10 to join the Southern Chester County League. In the same year, the PAC-10 admitted Boyertown which effectively kept the Pioneer Athletic League at 10-member status.

2007 Lansdale Catholic Moves to PCL, replaced by Methacton
On May 9, 2007, Lansdale Catholic administrators announced that they have accepted an invite to the Philadelphia Catholic League.  The move is effective in July 2008. On July 3, 2007, Methacton School District was accepted into the PAC-10 after their application was approved by the principals of the existing PAC-10 member schools.

2010 St. Pius X Merges with Kennedy-Kenrick, Becomes Pope John Paul HS
As of the end of the 2009–2010 school year, St. Pius X no longer exists. St. Pius X and Kennedy-Kenrick Catholic High School in Norristown merged to form a new high school named Pope John Paul II, located in Royersford. This school is already admitted to the PAC 10.

2016 Norristown & Upper Merion Join PAC
Beginning in August 2016, the Norristown Eagles and Upper Merion Vikings joined the PAC to make it a 12 team conference. This marks the first expansion of the PAC since 1988.

On January 29, 2015, Norristown Area School District school board voted 9–0 to leave the Suburban One and join the PAC after months of discussion.  Middle School sports will begin in September 2015 while the High School will join the league beginning with the 2016–17 school year.

On May 4, 2015, Upper Merion Area School District school board voted 8–1 to leave the Suburban One and join the PAC after many months of discussion.  Middle School sports will begin in September 2015 while the High School will join the league beginning with the 2016–17 school year along with Norristown.

References

External links
 PAC-10 Football
 PAC-10 Wrestling
 PAC-10 Baseball

High school sports associations in the United States
Pennsylvania high school sports conferences